Czchów Castle - Romanesque castle ruins located in Czchów, located on a hill known as the Keep on the Dunajec (Baszta nad Dunajcem) in Brzesko County, Lesser Poland Voivodeship in Poland. 

In the sixteenth-century, the sandstone-built royal castle was located in the Kraków Voivodeship.

See also
Czchów
Dunajec river castles
Castles in Poland

References

Castles in Lesser Poland Voivodeship